The Granville-Mott House is a historic house at 80 Laurel Avenue in Highland Park, Illinois. Built circa 1910, the house was designed by prominent Chicago architectural firm Tallmadge & Watson. The firm designed two houses and a church's chancel in Highland Park; the Granville-Mott House is the largest of these works. The house has a Tudor Revival design with Prairie School details. Its gable roof and extensive half-timbering are typical Tudor elements, while its casement windows and overhanging eaves are inspired by the Prairie School.

The house was added to the National Register of Historic Places on September 29, 1982.

References

National Register of Historic Places in Lake County, Illinois
Houses on the National Register of Historic Places in Illinois
Tudor Revival architecture in Illinois
Prairie School architecture in Illinois
Highland Park, Illinois
Houses completed in 1910